HNLMS K VIII was one of the three s of the Royal Netherlands Navy, built to serve as patrol vessel for the Dutch colonies. Launched in 1922 the boat saw service at the start of World War II, before being decommissioned in 1942.

Ship history
K VIII was ordered by the Dutch Ministry of Colonies from the shipyard Koninklijke Maatschappij de Schelde at Vlissingen on 27 June 1917, laid down on 31 October 1917, but not launched until 28 March 1922.

On 18 September 1922, K VIII began the journey to the Dutch East Indies. The convoy sailed from the port of Vlissingen, and called at Tunisia, Gibraltar, Alexandria, Aden, Colombo and Sabang, before arriving at Tanjung Priok on 24 December.

World War II
On the outbreak of the war with Japan, K VIII was in Surabaya, held in reserve. K VIII patrolled the Java Sea and the Madura Strait, but made no attacks on enemy ships. After the invasion of Java by the Japanese armed forces K VIII fled to Fremantle.

After K VIII arrived in Fremantle, the crew was sent to the United Kingdom to man new submarines. Because of the age and the resulting lack of a crew, it was decided to decommission K VIII on 18 May 1942.

Fate
After further stripping in 1943 the hull was towed south into Cockburn Sound where it was to be beached in Jervoise Bay and broken-up. The hulk remained there until 1957 when it was declared a navigational hazard for shipping using the new Kwinana Oil Refinery, and was destroyed with explosives.

References

 

1922 ships
Ships built in Vlissingen
K VIII-class submarines
World War II submarines of the Netherlands